Salim Heroui (born 19 March 1999 in Algiers) in an Algerian fencer. He competed at the 2020 Summer Olympics in the Men's Foil event. He finished in 35th place after losing to Vladislav Mylnikov of ROC in the Table of 64.

References 

1999 births
Living people
Fencers at the 2020 Summer Olympics
Algerian male foil fencers
Olympic fencers of Algeria
Sportspeople from Algiers
Fencers at the 2014 Summer Youth Olympics
21st-century Algerian people
Mediterranean Games competitors for Algeria
Competitors at the 2022 Mediterranean Games
20th-century Algerian people